The National Federation of Republican Assemblies (NFRA) is a political organization which promotes conservative principles and candidates within the Republican Party.  Members at the local, state and national levels work to recruit and elect Republican candidates who reflect the Party's conservative philosophy, and to oppose so-called "RINOs" (Republicans In Name Only), leaders and candidates who take positions to the left of the party's conservative mainstream.

The first Republican Assembly was founded in 1934 in California.  The Republican Assembly movement grew primarily in the western part of the United States until, in 1996, the several state Republican Assemblies formalized their relationship to one another through the creation of the NFRA, which was also tasked with the establishment of state chapters in those parts of the country to which the movement had not yet spread.

Purpose 
Republican Assemblies have three main purposes:

 to recruit activists into the Republican Party
 to elect conservative leadership to party offices
 to endorse and work for the nomination of conservative candidates in party primaries.

The Republican Assembly movement views itself as a reform movement within the Republican Party, and opposes the creation of one or more third parties, which it believes would split the conservative vote and result in the election of more Democrats.  Ronald Reagan called the Republican Assemblies "the conscience of the Republican Party," while others have called them "the Tea Party before there was a Tea Party."

A central aspect of the NFRA's mission is the endorsement of candidates in contested Republican primaries, something most Republican support groups and committees choose not to do.  NFRA endorsing conventions are held at the local and state levels, and a Presidential Preference Convention is held at the national level.  Candidates must win two-thirds of the votes cast at a convention to secure its endorsement.  Endorsements are upwardly binding:  a local or state chapter's endorsement automatically secures the endorsement of the higher levels of the organization.

In 2012, the NFRA's Presidential Preference Convention endorsed Rick Santorum for president on the fifth ballot. In 2016, it endorsed Senator Ted Cruz. In 2020, the NFRA endorsed Donald Trump.

National governance 
The NFRA is governed by a board of directors composed of its officers and three national directors from each state, one of which is the state's president.  Unlike the Republican National Committee, there is no gender requirement for any office. National officers are elected for two year terms at the organization's bi-annual convention.

Former Nevada Republican U.S. Senate nominee Sharron Angle was elected president on September 15, 2013. Former Ohio Secretary of State and Republican nominee in the 2006 Ohio gubernatorial election Ken Blackwell was elected executive vice president in 2011 and was re-elected in 2013.  In 2016, Angle resigned to run again for United States Senate, and was succeeded as president by Willes Lee, former chairman of the Republican Party of Hawaii. Lee is a West Point graduate, former Army Ranger, and a founder of the Republican National Committee's Conservative Caucus.

State and local chapters 
The NFRA is composed of state Republican Assemblies, which in turn are made up of local Republican Assemblies.  The latter of these elect state boards of directors in much the same way that the state assemblies elect the national board.  The NFRA is strongly federalist, both in its ideology and in its own internal organization:  most powers are vested in the state assemblies, while the NFRA is bound by national bylaws which strictly limit and enumerate its powers.

This federalist outlook extends even to endorsements. All levels of the organization hold grassroots endorsing conventions, according to the rules described above.  However, while the NFRA holds a Presidential Preference Convention every four years, its endorsement is not binding on the states:  each state may individually endorse a presidential candidate of its choosing for its own primary or caucus voters.  By contrast, local assemblies may endorse candidates in all races except statewide and federal offices, the latter endorsements being reserved to the state conventions, and all of these endorsements are upwardly binding on the levels of organization above them.

Advisory board 
Members of the advisory board include Fox News contributor and former Ronald Reagan and George H. W. Bush policy director Jim Pinkerton, U.S. Senator Ted Cruz's father and advisor Rafael Cruz, Conservatives of Faith founder Bob Fischer, former Crisis magazine publisher and senior George W. Bush advisor Deal Hudson, former appeals court justice and leader of the Conservative Resurgence in the Southern Baptist Convention Paul Pressler, National Religious Broadcasters president Jerry Johnson, fund manager and best-selling author Kevin Freeman, former Republican Study Committee executive director Paul Teller and former U.S. Congressman Ernest Istook.

Notable NFRA members 
Prominent current and past Republican Assembly members include President Ronald Reagan, storied actress Jane Russell, Eagle Forum founder Phyllis Schlafly, Americans for Tax Reform founder Grover Norquist, former U.S. Senator Rick Santorum, former Nevada U.S. Senate candidate Sharron Angle, former Ambassador and Ohio Secretary of State Ken Blackwell, conservative activist Morton Blackwell, Texas Republican Party Chairman Emeritus Tom Pauken, California Republican State Chairmen Ron Nehring and Tom Del Beccaro, former Republican National Committee Treasurer and Arizona Republican State Chairman Randy Pullen, former Mayor of Meriden and Connecticut Congressional candidate Manny A. Santos, and current U.S. Senators Rand Paul and Ted Cruz.

References

External links 
 NFRA Website
 Georgia Republican Assembly
 Tennessee Republican Assembly
 Ballotpedia.org

Political organizations based in the United States
Republican Party (United States) organizations
Conservative organizations in the United States